Acromycter longipectoralis is an eel in the family Congridae (conger/garden eels). It was described by Emma Stanislavovna Karmovskaya in 2004. It is a marine, deep water-dwelling eel which is known from New Caledonia, in the western Pacific Ocean. It is known to dwell at a depth of 580 metres. Females can reach a total length of 21.7 centimetres.

The species epithet refers to the characteristic long pectoral fins of the species.

References

Congridae
Fish described in 2004